The Ligue nationale de football professionnel National professional football league), commonly known as the LNFP, is a Tunisian governing body that runs the major professional football leagues in Tunisia. It was founded in 1994 and serves under the authority of the Tunisian Football Federation.  The president of the league is Mohamed Arbi.

The league is responsible for overseeing, organizing, and managing the top two leagues in Tunisia, Ligue 1 and is also responsible for the 32 professional football clubs that contest football in Tunisia (14 in Ligue Pro 1, 12 in Ligue Pro 2).

Presidents 

 1994–1998 : Abdellatif Dahmani.
 1998–2000 : Khaled Sanchou.
 2000–2002 : Mohamed Riahi.
 2002–2003 : Fethi Ben Youssef.
 2003–2004 : Taoufik Anane.
 2004–2010 : Ali Hafsi Jeddi.
 2010–2012 : Mohamed Sellami.
 2012 : Ahmed Ouerfelli (interim).
 2012–2016 : Mohamed Sellami.
 2016–2020 : Hafidh Chembah.
 2020–present : Mohamed Arbi.

Competitions 

 Tunisian Ligue Professionnelle 1
 Tunisian Ligue Professionnelle 2
 Tunisian Cup
 Tunisian Super Cup
 Tunisian League Cup (defunct)

References

External links 
Website

Sports governing bodies in Tunisia
Football in Tunisia